Barry Smith (born 21 January 1939) is a former Australian rules footballer who played for the Footscray Football Club in the Victorian Football League (VFL).

Notes

External links 
		

Living people
1939 births
Australian rules footballers from Victoria (Australia)
Western Bulldogs players